Declana is a genus of moths in the family Geometridae that is endemic to New Zealand. The genus was erected by Francis Walker in 1858.

Species
Species found in this genus include:
 Declana atronivea (Walker, 1865) – North Island lichen moth
 Declana egregia (Felder & Rogenhofer, 1875) – South Island lichen moth
Declana feredayi Butler, 1877
 Declana floccosa Walker, 1858 – forest semilooper
Declana glacialis Hudson, 1903
 Declana griseata Hudson, 1898
Declana hermione Hudson, 1898
 Declana junctilinea (Walker, 1865)
Declana leptomera (Walker, 1858)
 Declana niveata Butler, 1879
 Declana toreuta Meyrick, 1929

References

External links

Ennominae
Geometridae genera
Endemic fauna of New Zealand
Taxa named by Francis Walker (entomologist)
Endemic moths of New Zealand